South Korea is competing at the 2013 World Aquatics Championships in Barcelona, Spain between 19 July and 4 August 2013.

Diving

South Korea qualified six quota places for the following diving events.

Men

Women

Swimming

South Korean swimmers earned qualifying standards in the following events (up to a maximum of 2 swimmers in each event at the A-standard entry time, and 1 at the B-standard):

Men

Women

Synchronized swimming

South Korea has qualified twelve synchronized swimmers.

References

External links
Barcelona 2013 Official Site
Korean Swimming Federation 

Nations at the 2013 World Aquatics Championships
2013 in South Korean sport
South Korea at the World Aquatics Championships